The Warner Bros. Water Tower is a historic water tower located at the  Warner Bros. Studios in Burbank, California. It now serves as a company icon.

History and usage in media

The tower was previously located next to the Warner Bros. Fire Department, and was moved following the 1933 Long Beach earthquake, when the Warners realized that if the tower fell onto the Fire Department, it would disrupt emergency assistance. Towers such as these were a common feature of Hollywood studios of the era, as they provided an emergency water supply in case of fire. Similar towers can be found at the Walt Disney, Paramount, Universal and Sony Pictures Studios (formerly MGM) lots.

The tower has appeared in a number of productions of the company, including any that showed the studio lot, whether live action or animated. For instance, it serves as the home for Yakko, Wakko, and Dot Warner from the Warner Bros. animated series Animaniacs, starting in-universe from the 1930s until their escape in the 1990s, with them moving back into the tower in the 2020 revival. The water tower (including the block's logo adorning the tower) and its studio backdrop were used in interstitials for Kids' WB, a children's programming block that primarily ran from 1995 to 2006 on The WB network, and later on The CW network from 2006 to 2008. The tower is also the basis for the name and logo of the company's record label, WaterTower Music.

An inspired version was built in Warner Bros. Park Madrid in 2002, and another one has been built in 2018 at the front entrance of the Warner Bros. World theme park in Abu Dhabi, UAE.

Occasionally, the water tower has been repainted to promote the 90th anniversary of the studio, the release of The Lego Batman Movie, and the launch of HBO Max, and it was repainted again to reflect the formation of Warner Bros. Discovery.

Starting with the HBO Max original film, Locked Down, the repainted water tower is featured in the current Warner Bros. Pictures opening for the first time and is now the focal point of the studio lot (now rendered in photorealistic CGI) portion of the sequence. The entire opening sequence was rendered as CGI by Devastudios to show the studio lot at magic hour, with the sun rising over the Cahuenga Pass to the south, using Terragen for the sky and clouds, along with the studio's blueprints from the Warner Bros. Studio Facilities and the available photography and videography from Warner Bros. Studio Tour Hollywood and Google Maps, all in order to reconstruct it in CGI.  In real life, the sun rises in the east, over the Forest Lawn cemetery and the Walt Disney Studios.

Gallery

See also
 Earffel Tower, a faux water tower at Disneyland Paris' Walt Disney Studios Park and formerly at Disney's Hollywood Studios in Walt Disney World

References

Warner Bros. Studios
Buildings and structures in Burbank, California
Water towers in California
Towers completed in 1927
1927 establishments in California